Delleker is a census-designated place (CDP) in Plumas County, California, USA.  The population was 705 at the 2010 census, up from 674 at the 2000 census.

Geography
Delleker is located at  (39.811343, -120.497651).

Demographics

2010
At the 2010 census Delleker had a population of 705. The racial makeup of Delleker was 503 (71.3%) White, 7 (1.0%) African American, 23 (3.3%) Native American, 3 (0.4%) Asian, 0 (0.0%) Pacific Islander, 133 (18.9%) from other races, and 36 (5.1%) from two or more races. Hispanic or Latino of any race were 186 people (26.4%).

The whole population lived in households, no one lived in non-institutionalized group quarters and no one was institutionalized.

There were 267 households, 103 (38.6%) had children under the age of 18 living in them, 126 (47.2%) were opposite-sex married couples living together, 40 (15.0%) had a female householder with no husband present, 12 (4.5%) had a male householder with no wife present.  There were 25 (9.4%) unmarried opposite-sex partnerships, and 1 (0.4%) same-sex married couples or partnerships. 67 households (25.1%) were one person and 22 (8.2%) had someone living alone who was 65 or older. The average household size was 2.64.  There were 178 families (66.7% of households); the average family size was 3.22.

The age distribution was 199 people (28.2%) under the age of 18, 51 people (7.2%) aged 18 to 24, 181 people (25.7%) aged 25 to 44, 194 people (27.5%) aged 45 to 64, and 80 people (11.3%) who were 65 or older.  The median age was 37.3 years. For every 100 females, there were 95.3 males.  For every 100 females age 18 and over, there were 85.3 males.

There were 330 housing units at an average density of 119.1 per square mile, of the occupied units 188 (70.4%) were owner-occupied and 79 (29.6%) were rented. The homeowner vacancy rate was 5.5%; the rental vacancy rate was 6.9%.  474 people (67.2% of the population) lived in owner-occupied housing units and 231 people (32.8%) lived in rental housing units.

2000
At the 2000 census there were 674 people, 264 households, and 180 families in the CDP. The racial makeup of the CDP was 86.05% White, 0.74% Black or African American, 4.45% Native American, 0.30% Asian, 2.67% from other races, and 5.79% from two or more races.  16.17% of the population were Hispanic or Latino of any race.
Of the 264 households 32.6% had children under the age of 18 living with them, 54.9% were married couples living together, 11.0% had a female householder with no husband present, and 31.8% were non-families. 27.3% of households were one person and 11.0% were one person aged 65 or older.  The average household size was 2.55 and the average family size was 3.12.

The age distribution was 28.5% under the age of 18, 7.0% from 18 to 24, 26.1% from 25 to 44, 26.3% from 45 to 64, and 12.2% 65 or older.  The median age was 36 years. For every 100 females, there were 103.0 males.  For every 100 females age 18 and over, there were 99.2 males.

The median household income was $37,500 and the median family income  was $40,573. Males had a median income of $34,286 versus $16,406 for females. The per capita income for the CDP was $15,848.  About 11.2% of families and 13.8% of the population were below the poverty line, including 25.2% of those under age 18 and none of those age 65 or over.

Politics

References

Census-designated places in Plumas County, California
Census-designated places in California